Halāhala (Sanskrit हलाहल) or kālakūṭa (Sanskrit कालकूटं, literally: 'black mass' or 'time puzzle') is the name of a poison in Hindu mythology. It was created from the Ocean of Milk when the devas and the asuras churned it (see Samudra Manthana) in order to obtain amrita, the nectar of immortality.

Fourteen different ratnas (treasures) were recovered from this episode, which were distributed between the two clans. But before the amrita could be formed, Halāhala was produced, which started injuring both sides. As no one could bear the lethal fumes emitted by the poison, both the devas and the asuras began to collapse due to asphyxiation. They ran for help to Brahma who advised them to seek assistance from Shiva. Both parties went to Mount Kailash, and prayed to Shiva for help. 

Shiva chose to consume the entire poison and thus drank it. His wife, the goddess Parvati, was alarmed, as she gripped her husband's neck with both hands in order to stop the poison from reaching his stomach, thus earning him the name Viṣakaṇṭha (the one who held poison in his (Shiva's) throat). The poison turned his throat blue. Hence, he is also known as Nīlakaṇṭha (the one with a blue throat).

However, according to a lesser known Vaishnava Madhva version of the legend, when halāhala was produced, Vayu, the god of wind, rubbed in his hands to reduce its potency. Then a small portion was given to Shiva, turning his throat blue. The rest was collected in a golden vessel and digested by Vayu. In another version, Vayu drank first and Shiva last. In yet another version, Shiva drank the kālakūṭa poison of Vasuki, second king of the nāgas, a familiar of Shiva whom Shiva blessed and often draped around his own neck as they spent time together, for it was Vasuki, stretched out stiffly, whom the gods used as the tool for the churning of the Ocean of Milk. 

A little portion of poison that wasn't swallowed by Shiva became the body of the demonic asura Kali (not the goddess Kali). From this poison also came "cruel objects like snakes, wolves, and tigers."

In popular culture
The second episode of Indian television show Sacred Games was named Halahala based on the poison.

See also
Samudra Manthana
Kshira Sagara 
Vasuki 
Kali (asura)

References

Hindu mythology
Shaivism
Poisons